The 2008–09 Northern Football League season was the 111th in the history of Northern Football League, a football competition in England.

Division One

Division One featured 19 clubs which competed in the division last season, along with three new clubs, promoted from Division Two:
 Penrith Town, who also changed name to Penrith
 Ryton
 South Shields

League table

Division Two

Division Two featured 17 clubs which competed in the division last season, along with three new clubs:
 Jarrow Roofing BCA, relegated from Division One
 Washington, relegated from Division One
 Whitehaven, promoted from the Wearside Football League

League table

References

External links
 Northern Football League official site

Northern Football League seasons
9